The Burlington metropolitan area is a metropolitan area consisting of the three Vermont counties of Chittenden, Franklin, and Grand Isle. The metro area is anchored by the principal cities of Burlington, South Burlington, St. Albans, Winooski, and  Essex Junction; and the towns of Colchester, Essex and Milton. According to 2012 U.S. Census estimates, the metro area had an estimated population of 213,701, approximately one third of Vermont's total population.

The Office of Management and Budget defines the area as one of its metropolitan statistical areas (the Burlington-South Burlington Metropolitan Statistical Area), a designation used for statistical purposes by the U.S. Census Bureau and other agencies. The MSA designation represents the counties containing the contiguous urbanized area centered on the city of Burlington, plus adjacent counties that are socially and economically linked to the urban core (as measured by commuting). An alternative definition using towns instead of counties as basic units is the Burlington-South Burlington New England City and Town Area (NECTA).

Counties
List of counties making up the MSA:
Chittenden
Franklin
Grand Isle

Towns and cities
List of towns/cities making up the NECTA:

Alburgh
Bolton
Buels Gore
Burlington (Principal city)
Cambridge
Charlotte
Colchester
Duxbury
Essex
Hinesburg
Huntington
Fairfax
Fairfield
Ferrisburg
Fletcher
Georgia
Grand Isle
Isle La Motte
Jericho
Milton
Monkton
North Hero
Richmond
St. Albans (city)
St. Albans (town)
St. George
Shelburne
South Burlington (Principal city)
South Hero
Starksboro
Swanton
Underhill
Vergennes
Westford
Williston
Winooski

Demographics

As of the census of 2000, there were 198,889 people, 75,978 households, and 49,311 families residing within the MSA. The racial makeup of the MSA was 95.43% White, 0.74% African American, 0.58% Native American, 1.53% Asian, 0.02% Pacific Islander, 0.30% from other races, and 1.40% from two or more races. Hispanic or Latino of any race were 0.94% of the population.

Economy
The metro had a gross metropolitan product of $8.38 billion in 2004, 38.2% of the total for the state. Personal income was $7 billion.

Personal income
The median income for a household in the MSA was $44,122, and the median income for a family was $51,690. Males had a median income of $35,363 versus $26,070 for females. The per capita income for the MSA was $21,175.

The median wage in the area in 2008 was $16.47 hourly or $34,258 annually. This was 7.6% higher than in the rest of the state.

Industry
The largest industrial facility in Vermont is GlobalFoundries's semiconductor plant in Essex Junction. GlobalFoundries took over the plant in June 2015, after IBM ceased operations at the plant.
As of 2008, GE Healthcare employed 780 people in Burlington.

Companies headquartered in the metro area include:

Dealer.com, headquartered in Burlington
Burton Snowboards, headquartered in Burlington
Lake Champlain Chocolates, headquartered in Burlington
Seventh Generation, Inc., headquartered in Burlington
Ben & Jerry's Homemade, Inc., headquartered in South Burlington
Vermont Student Assistance Corporation, headquartered in Winooski
MyWebGrocer, headquartered in Winooski
Pet Food Warehouse Vermont, headquartered in South Burlington

Hospitals include University of Vermont Medical Center in Burlington and Colchester and Northwestern Medical Center in St. Albans.

Volunteers
The metropolitan area ranked ten points higher than the US average, helping to propel the state to ninth in the country for volunteerism for the period 2005–8. 37.4% of the population volunteered during this period. The national average was 26.4%. The local average annual number of hours was 40.8.

Public health and safety
One study ranked the area fourth highest in gun safety, out of 100.

Media

There are four network-affiliated television stations in the city. They include WFFF channel 44 (Fox),  WFFF's digital subchannel 44-2 (The CW),  its sister station, WVNY channel 22 (ABC), WPTZ (NBC), and WCAX channel 3 (CBS). WCAX, WFFF, and WPTZ operate news departments. WCAX is the only Burlington-based news department, while WPTZ is licensed in Plattsburgh, New York yet operates out of South Burlington. WFFF and WVNY are also based in Colchester.

Vermont PBS is based in Colchester.

Comcast Communications is the city's major cable television service provider. Residents within the city limits are also served by municipally owned Burlington Telecom.

These public access channels are Burlington based: Public-access television VCAM-Channel 15, RETN-Channel 16, and Channel 17.

Newspapers published in the Burlington metropolitan area include:
 Burlington Free Press - Burlington, Vermont
 St. Albans Messenger - St. Albans, Vermont
Franklin County Courier - Enosburg Falls, Vermont
 The Islander -  North Hero, Vermont
 Milton Independent - Milton, Vermont
 The Other Paper - South Burlington, Vermont
Seven Days - Burlington, Vermont
 Shelburne News - Shelburne, Vermont
 Williston Observer - Williston, Vermont

See also
Vermont census statistical areas
New England City and Town Area

References

 
Chittenden County, Vermont
Franklin County, Vermont
Grand Isle County, Vermont